Benjamin Gordon Malison Wood (20 June 1931 – 18 May 1982) was a rugby union footballer who represented Ireland and the British and Irish Lions during the 1950s and early 1960s. He also played for both Garryowen and Munster. His son Keith Wood would later play for the same four teams.

Early years
Wood was educated at Crescent College and once scored four tries - playing at wing against Mungret College. Among his team mates while playing for Crescent was the actor Richard Harris.

Rugby international

Ireland
Between 1954 and 1961, Wood made 29 full appearances for Ireland. He made his Ireland debut on 13 February 1954 in 14-3 defeat against England at Twickenham. He scored his only try on 27 February 1960 in a 6-5 defeat against Scotland at Lansdowne Road. Wood made his last full appearance for Ireland on 13 May 1961 in a 24-8 away defeat against South Africa.

British & Irish Lions
Together with Tony O'Reilly, Andy Mulligan, Ronnie Dawson, Syd Millar and Noel Murphy, Wood was part of a strong Ireland contingent included in the British Lions squad for their 1959 tour to Australia and New Zealand. Wood played in 15 of the 33 tour games, including two Test games against New Zealand. He made his debut for the Lions against Victoria on 23 May and played his final game against North Auckland on 12 September. He scored two tries on the tour - one against New Zealand Universities on 1 July and another against Marlborough and Nelson Bays on 29 July.

Gordon Wood Trophy
Wood later became the first coach of the Garda Rugby Football Club. The club continues to play an annual challenge match against an Irish Defence Forces XV in his honour with the winners being awarded the Gordon Wood Trophy.

References

1931 births
1982 deaths
Rugby union players from Limerick (city)
Irish rugby union players
Ireland international rugby union players
British & Irish Lions rugby union players from Ireland
Munster Rugby players
Garryowen Football Club players
Lansdowne Football Club players
Irish rugby union coaches
People educated at Crescent College